Gérard Denecheau (29 March 1939 – 20 October 2010) was a French sports shooter. He competed in the 50 metre pistol event at the 1972 Summer Olympics.

References

1939 births
2010 deaths
French male sport shooters
Olympic shooters of France
Shooters at the 1972 Summer Olympics
Place of birth missing